The 1986 European Curling Championships were held from 9 to 13 December at the Hvidovre Ice Rink arena in Copenhagen, Denmark.

The Swiss men's team skipped by Felix Luchsinger won their sixth title and the West German women's team skipped by Andrea Schöpp won their second title.

Men

Teams

First Phase (Triple Knockout)

Round 1
Two teams promoted to Second Phase

Round 2
Three teams promoted to Second Phase

Round 3
Three teams promoted to Second Phase

Second Phase (Double Knockout)

Round 1
Two teams promoted to Playoffs

Round 2
Two teams promoted to Playoffs

Placement Phase

Range 9-13

Range 5-8

Playoffs

Final standings

Women

Teams

First Phase (Triple Knockout)

Round 1
Two teams promoted to Second Phase

Round 2
Three teams promoted to Second Phase

Round 3
Three teams promoted to Second Phase

Second Phase (Double Knockout)

Round 1
Two teams promoted to Playoffs

Round 2
Two teams promoted to Playoffs

Placement Phase

Range 9-13

Range 5-8

Playoffs

Final standings

References

European Curling Championships, 1986
European Curling Championships, 1986
European Curling Championships
International curling competitions hosted by Denmark
December 1986 sports events in Europe
International sports competitions in Copenhagen
1980s in Copenhagen